The American Express Centurion Card, colloquially known as the Black Card, is a charge card issued by American Express. It is reserved for the company's wealthiest clients who meet certain net worth, credit quality, and spending requirements on its gateway card, the Platinum Card. The firm does not disclose the exact requirements to receive an invitation to carry the card. The Centurion Card is minted out of anodized titanium, laser-engraved, and accented with stainless steel. The card reports to credit bureaus and does not maintain a pre-set credit limit. It is considered a status symbol among the affluent.

History
In 1988, an article in The Wall Street Journal newspaper reported that an exclusive black American Express membership card that was never advertised had been discontinued a year earlier. The article claimed that during a trial run that lasted almost four years, the card "was held by an ultra-select group of consumers who numbered fewer than 1,000 around the world." Lee Middleton, a spokesman for American Express, confirmed the card's existence to the Journal and said that it was given to clients who had a "substantial banking relationship" with American Express Bank Ltd., the New York parent of American Express's bank subsidiaries in Switzerland. Services included "dispatching limousines or helicopters for clients, booking their vacations and finding medical care in exotic places." Middleton said American Express abandoned the black card in 1987 because the newly introduced Platinum Card offered "95% of the black card's services." In 1999, American Express introduced the Centurion Card, a black charge card aimed at the company's wealthiest cardholders. In a 2018 episode of the Netflix show Comedians in Cars Getting Coffee, Jerry Seinfeld, who appeared in American Express commercials in the 1990s, claimed to have received the first Centurion card after contacting the company's president about the rumored existence of an exclusive black card.

Doug Smith, the director of American Express in Europe, told the fact-checking website Snopes.com that there "had been rumors going around that we had this ultra-exclusive black card for elite customers. It wasn't true, but we decided to capitalize on the idea anyway. So far we've had a customer buy a Bentley and another charter a jet." The website lists unverified descriptions of cardholder requests, such as dispatching a motorcycle rider to the shores of the Dead Sea to retrieve a handful of sand and couriering it back to London for a child's school project. In 2009, Luxury Card successfully registered "Black Card" as a U.S. trademark. American Express later sued as the name was similar to its Centurion Card, which it contended was widely known as the "Black Card." The U.S. District Court for the Southern District of New York ruled that Black Card, LLC's trademark of the name "Black Card" should be canceled on grounds that it was merely descriptive. As of 2019, it uses the registered trademark under license.

Since its introduction, the Centurion card has only been issued to clients invited by American Express to apply for it. The selection criteria the company uses to identify potential cardholders has been subject to speculation. Select media reports speculate an annual spending requirement of $100,000 to $250,000 on the Platinum Card to be considered for eligibility. In most countries where the card is issued, it's made of anodized titanium with the information and numbers laser etched into the metal. In some locations, such as Israel, EMV "chip" plastic cards, which also include the ExpressPay contactless payment technology, are issued. The Centurion Card comes in personal and business variants.

The largest known purchase made with the Centurion card is the Nu couché painting by Amedeo Modigliani, which businessman Liu Yiqian bought for US$170,405,000 at a Christie's auction in New York in 2015.

Features

Fees

Benefits
The card, available for personal and business use, offers services such as a dedicated concierge and travel agent; complimentary companion airline tickets on international flights on selected airlines with the purchase of a full-fare ticket; personal shoppers at retailers such as Gucci, Escada, and Saks Fifth Avenue; access to airport clubs; first-class flight upgrades; membership in Sony's Cierge personal shopping program and dozens of other elite club memberships. Hotel benefits include one free night, when at least one paid night is booked during the same stay, in every Mandarin Oriental hotel worldwide once a year (except for the New York City property), and privileges at hotel chains like Ritz-Carlton, Leading Hotels of the World, and Amanresorts. The card also features complimentary enrollment in Easirent Car Hire Platinum Service and the Avis Rent a Car President's Club.

Centurion Card members, like Platinum Card members, get complimentary access to the American Express Centurion Lounges at several US airports. They also get no pre-set credit limit access to Priority Pass lounges around the world, plus additional lounge privileges based on the country their card is registered in. For example, Centurion cardholders in Canada also receive full access to Maple Leaf Lounges, a lounge network provided by Air Canada. At busy times, Centurion members have access to areas reserved for them. There are also drink options at the bar that are exclusive to Centurion members. As of 2015, they have a Champagne option of Veuve Clicquot and a single malt scotch by Balvenie. US cardholders earn 1 rewards point per dollar on all eligible purchases and 1.5 rewards points per dollar on purchases over US$5,000 (Up to 1 million additional points per calendar year).

Publications
Since the inception of the card, members have received a copy of Departures, which is also sent to all Platinum Card cardholders. In 2004, American Express Centurion members in the US began receiving an exclusive "no name" magazine, which was not available by any other means. Starting with the Spring 2007 edition, this magazine was officially titled Black Ink. The magazine is available only to individual Centurion cardholders, not to the business-edition customers. European, Asian, and Australian Centurion members receive quarterly the Centurion magazine published by Journal International GmbH (Munich, Germany). In June 2011, the Centurion magazine website was launched, offering daily updates for Centurion Card members. According to Journal International, the average age of a Centurion reader from Europe or the Middle East is 49 years. Centurion has been published since 2001 and has a circulation in Europe and the Middle East of 44,100, in Asia of 13,900, and in Australia of 6,000.

In popular culture

Famous cardholders

American Express does not disclose a list of Centurion cardholders but a number of celebrities have been associated with the card.

During the filming of a backstage interview at the 2007 BRIT Awards, Noel Gallagher held his Centurion card up to the camera and said "You have to earn a ridiculous amount of money per year to own one of those." In a 2009 interview with talkSPORT, Gallagher said, "I do own a black Amex card that has no pre-set credit limit credit and cannot be denied anywhere. I could walk into a showroom selling Boeing 747s and, regardless of whether I could afford it, they'd have to accept the card."

Former Top Gear presenter Jeremy Clarkson wrote in a 2004 article for The Times of London newspaper that he lied about his salary to obtain a Centurion card after reading "an interview with some chap who'd got a fist full of cards in his pocket and claimed that the more shiny examples, specifically the much-coveted black American Express, gave him certain privileges." Clarkson ultimately decided to cancel the card after being unimpressed with its benefits.

Music

The Centurion card has become a status symbol in the music industry, especially in hip-hop culture. In 2002, Bloomberg News reported that rapper Sean "P. Diddy" Combs used the card to buy 400 cocktails at a bar in Los Angeles. In the song "Doing It Way Big" (2003), Lil' Kim sings: I smack niggas 'cross the face with a Centurion card / Who don't believe I'm (doing it way big). Lil' Kim later posed with a Centurion card attached to a diamond-studded necklace for a Nylon magazine photoshoot. In the song "Last Call" (2004), Kanye West refers to the card with the lyrics: I went to the malls and I balled too hard / "Oh my God, is that a black card?" / I turned around and replied, "Why yes / But I prefer the term African American Express". In "Welcome Back" (2004), Mase sings: Amex black card / Shopper of the year. In "Get It Poppin'" (2005), Fat Joe sings: I got that black no limit American Express card. In Einmal um die Welt (2012), German rapper Cro says his girlfriend can buy what she wants because he has "an American Express, and of course the black one." Other singers including Ariana Grande, Beyoncé, Jay-Z, Lady Gaga, Bow Wow, Nelly Furtado, Lil Wayne, Nickelback also mention black cards in their song lyrics but not a specific American Express product.

Film and TV

The Centurion card has been used as an on-screen prop.

In Quantum of Solace, James Bond hands a Centurion card to a travel agent with a private jet chartering company to pay for a flight to Bolivia. The payment is declined by MI6 as the intelligence service seeks to strip Bond of his duties and revokes his credit cards and passports. The Centurion replica used in the film was part of the Bond in Motion exhibition at the London Film Museum.

In the pilot episode of the USA Network medical comedy-drama show Royal Pains, Tucker Bryant, the young heir to a family fortune earned from inventing the blender, injures himself crashing his father’s Ferrari. He tells a doctor to "go into my wallet and get the little black card that says American Express on it" and flies by helicopter from the Hamptons to Mount Sinai Hospital in Manhattan.

In an episode of the NBC crime-drama show Law & Order: Special Victims Unit, one character is described as "by the look of his black American Express, very rich."

In two episodes of the HBO comedy-drama show Succession, Kendall and Siobhan Roy, heirs to a media fortune, use their Centurion cards at a bar and a coffee shop.

In an episode of the CBS sitcom Two and a Half Men, internet billionaire Walden Schmidt uses the card to buy groceries.

In an episode of the tvN romantic-drama show Crash Landing on You, businesswoman Yoon Se-ri uses the Centurion card to purchase clothing for Ri Jeong-hyeok.

Literature

In Lauren Weisberger's novel Everyone Worth Knowing, the protagonist Bette remarks on her coworker paying for dinner with the card: "There it was, the mythical American Express black card. Available by invitation only to those who charged a minimum of $150,000 per year."

In Robert Crais's novel The Watchman, the daughter of a wealthy businessman is described as having a Centurion card.

The main character in Cory Doctorow's book Attack Surface uses an American Express Black card several times.

The main character, Romeo Costa, in the book Dark Romeo written by Parker S. Huntington and LJ Shen uses this card in the book.

See also 

 J.P. Morgan and the Reserve Card (Palladium Card)
 MasterCard and Visa
 Credit score in the United States
 Banking in the United States

References

External links 
 

American Express
Credit cards
Lifestyle magazines published in the United States
1999 introductions
Credit cards in the United States

de:American Express#Besonderheiten